The Devil's Brigade, Devil's Brigade, or Devils Brigade may refer to:

 The Devil's Brigade, a nickname for the First Special Service Force, a joint Canadian–US commando unit that formed during World War II.
 The Devil's Brigade (film), a 1968 film about the First Special Service Force
 Devils Brigade (band), an American rock band
 Devils Brigade (album), a 2010 album by the Devils Brigade band
 "Devils Brigade", a song on the 1999 album The Gang's All Here, by the Dropkick Murphys
 The Devil's Brigade (comics), a former comics series by Charlton Comics
 Devil's Brigade, a Canadian television series produced by Frantic Films